The Thomas F. Hoppin House is a historic house at 383 Benefit Street in the College Hill neighborhood of Providence, Rhode Island.  The house was built c. 1853 to a design by Alpheus C. Morse, and is an elaborate local example of an Italianate palazzo-style residence. The Library of Congress called the property "one of the largest and most elegant houses built in Providence in the mid-nineteenth century."

History

The previous house on the property was the Clark House, built by John I. Clark, which was destroyed by a fire in 1849.

The current mansion was built for Thomas Frederick Hoppin (1816-1872), son of Thomas Coles Hoppin and Harriet Dunn Hoppin, a prominent local family of diplomats, physicians, artists, and architects which included his brother, illustrator Augustus Hoppin. Thomas Frederick was a painter, sculptor and engraver.

At one time, the front lawn was home to "The Sentinel," a bronze statue of a dog, which was designed by Hoppin and cast by the Gorham Company; the statue was later moved to Roger Williams Park.

The Hoppins were well known for the social gatherings, and their house became known as the "house of a thousand candles".

The house was listed on the National Register of Historic Places in 1973.

Until 2019 the mansion was home to the Annenberg Institute for School Reform at Brown University. In 2021, Brown sold the property for $2 million. The new owner intends to implement a "first class renovation" and convert the property to a luxury apartment building with about a half dozen units.

See also
National Register of Historic Places listings in Providence, Rhode Island

References

External links

Houses on the National Register of Historic Places in Rhode Island
Brown University buildings
Houses in Providence, Rhode Island
Renaissance Revival architecture in Rhode Island
Houses completed in 1853
Historic American Buildings Survey in Rhode Island
National Register of Historic Places in Providence, Rhode Island
Individually listed contributing properties to historic districts on the National Register in Rhode Island